The Henry Draper Medal is awarded every 4 years by the United States National Academy of Sciences "for investigations in astronomical physics". Named after Henry Draper, the medal is awarded with a gift of USD $15,000. The medal was established under the Draper Fund by his widow, Anna Draper, in honor of her husband, and was first awarded in 1886 to Samuel Pierpont Langley "for numerous investigations of a high order of merit in solar physics, and especially in the domain of radiant energy". It has since been awarded 45 times.

The medal has been awarded to multiple individuals in the same year: in 1977 it was awarded to Arno Allan Penzias and Robert Woodrow Wilson "for their discovery of the cosmic microwave radiation (a remnant of the very early universe), and their leading role in the discovery of interstellar molecules"; in 1989 to Riccardo Giovanelli and Martha P. Haynes "for the first three-dimensional view of some of the remarkable large-scale filamentary structures of our visible universe"; in 1993 to Ralph Asher Alpher and Robert Herman "for their insight and skill in developing a physical model of the evolution of the universe and in predicting the existence of a microwave background radiation years before this radiation was serendipitously discovered" and in 2001 to R. Paul Butler and Geoffrey Marcy "for their pioneering investigations of planets orbiting other stars via high-precision radial velocities".

List of recipients 
Source: National Academy of Sciences

See also

 List of astronomy awards
 List of physics awards

References 

Astronomy prizes
Awards established in 1886
Awards of the United States National Academy of Sciences
1886 establishments in the United States